Rasheed Ummer is an Indian actor, who primarily works in Malayalam and Tamil films. He made his début as a hero in Kannaram Pothi Pothi and later was a part of the much acclaimed Oru Vadakkan Veeragatha. He is the son of famous Malayalam cinema actor K. P. Ummer.

He is also a professional dubbing artiste. Now he dubs for 'Prajapathi Dhaksha' from the serial Kailasanathan which airs in Asianet channel. Apart from films and serials, Rasheed Ummer also concentrates in Herbal Oil business based at Chennai.

Filmography

References

External links

Living people
Year of birth missing (living people)
Male actors from Kozhikode
Male actors in Malayalam cinema
Indian male film actors
Male actors in Tamil cinema
Indian male voice actors
20th-century Indian male actors
21st-century Indian male actors